USS Flamingo is a name used more than once by the U.S. Navy in naming its ships:

  laid down 18 October 1917 by the New Jersey Drydock and Transportation Co., Elizabethport, New Jersey.
  laid down in 1940 as the fishing dragger Harriet N. Eldridge; Acquired by the U.S. Navy, 4 November 1940.
  laid down 11 May 1942 by Stadium Yacht Basin Inc., Cleveland, Ohio.

References 

United States Navy ship names